Philoxenus of Eretria was a painter from Eretria. He was a disciple of Nicomachus of Thebes, whose speed in painting he imitated and even surpassed, having discovered new and rapid methods of coloring. Nevertheless, Pliny states that a picture of his was inferior to none, depicting a battle of Alexander the Great with Darius, which he painted for King Cassander. 

A similar subject is represented in the celebrated Alexander Mosaic found in the House of the Faun, Pompeii. As a disciple of Nicomachus, who flourished about 360 BC, and as the painter of the battle of Issus (333 BC), or it could have been the battle of Gaugamela in 331 BC. They both have the requirements. Philoxenus must have flourished in the age of Alexander, about 330 BC and onwards. The words of Pliny, "Cassandro regi", "Cassander being king", if taken literally, would show that the date of his great picture must have been after 317 or 315 BC, during the reign of Cassander in Macedon.

References

Painters of Alexander the Great
Ancient Greek painters
Ancient Eretrians
4th-century BC painters